Thanongsak Panpipat (born August 3, 1979) is a Thai professional footballer who plays as a goalkeeper.

Honours

Club
Muangthong United
 Thai Premier League (1): 2009, 2010

External links
 

1979 births
Living people
Thanongsak Panpipat
Thanongsak Panpipat
Association football goalkeepers
Thanongsak Panpipat
Thanongsak Panpipat
Thanongsak Panpipat
Thanongsak Panpipat
Thanongsak Panpipat
Thanongsak Panpipat
Thanongsak Panpipat
Thanongsak Panpipat